Jeremy Scott McPike (born September 19, 1975) is an American politician from Virginia. A member of the Democratic Party, McPike is the member of the Virginia Senate, who has represented the 29th district since the 2015 election.

Jeremy McPike has spent his life in Prince William County, attending Elizabeth Vaughan Elementary, Fred Lynn Middle and graduating from Gar-Field High School.

McPike attended George Mason University for his Bachelor's and Master's of Public Administration degrees. He supported himself by working as a construction laborer and superintendent.

McPike works for the City of Alexandria, currently serving as the Director of General Services. He also serves as a volunteer firefighter and EMT with the Dale City Volunteer Fire Department at the rank of captain.

McPike and his wife Sharon live in Dale City with their three daughters.

Electoral history

References

External links
 
 
Official Legislative website

Living people
Democratic Party Virginia state senators
George Mason University alumni
Politicians from Washington, D.C.
People from Dale City, Virginia
1975 births
21st-century American politicians